Plener is a surname. Notable people with the surname include:

 Ernst Plener (1919–2007), German footballer
 Ernst von Plener (1841–1923), Austrian politician
 Ignaz von Plener (1810–1908), Austrian baron and politician
 Ulla Plener (born 1933), German historian